The Transportation Museum at Ystafell is the oldest transportation museum in Iceland, established in 1998 and opened in July 2000. Located between Akureyri (~57 km) and Húsavík (~37 km) it sits in the valley Kaldakinn. The museum features a collection of historic cars and trucks, and displays about roads and road transport in Iceland.

See also 
 List of museums in Iceland

References

External links 

 Official website 
 Official website 

Automotive museums
Museums in Iceland